Karolina Jovanović (Serbian Cyrillic: Каролина Јовановић; born 13 February 1988) is a Serbian former tennis player.

Jovanović won two singles and 13 doubles titles on the ITF Circuit in her career. On 30 July 2007, she reached her best singles ranking of world No. 404. On 20 August 2007, she peaked at No. 201 in the doubles rankings.

ITF Circuit finals

Singles: 6 (2–4)

Doubles: 25 (13–12)

References

External links
 
 

1988 births
Living people
Sportspeople from Niš
Serbian female tennis players
Serbia and Montenegro female tennis players